INS Vela (S40) was the lead ship of four diesel-electric Vela-class submarines  of the Indian Navy. The submarine was commissioned on 31 August 1973 in Riga, Latvian SSR. Along with her sister ship Vagli, she spent almost 10 years undergoing a protracted refit by Hindustan Shipyard. After 37 years of service, the submarine was decommissioned on 25 June 2010. The submarine was claimed by the Eastern Naval Command to be the oldest operational submarine in the world at the time of her decommissioning.

Vela is the name of an Indian fish from the stingray species known for its aggression and offensive power, and the ability to camouflage itself from predators.

References

Vela-class submarines
1972 ships
Foxtrot-class submarines
Ships built in the Soviet Union
Museums in Chennai